Kooroongarra is a rural town and locality in the Toowoomba Region, Queensland, Australia.

History 
Kooroongarra South Provisional School opened on 10 August 1891. On 1 January 1909, it became Kooroongarra South State School. It closed in 1967. It was at approx 2325 Kooroongarra Road.

St Mark's Presbyterian Church opened on 3 September 1897 in Kooroongarra Road. It was consecrated on 5 May 1968. It became St Mark's Uniting Church on 22 June 1977. It was deconsecrated on 5 December 1999. It was later relocated to the Millmerran Museum at 17 Mary Street, Millmerran.

St Alban's Anglican church was dedicated in 1907. Its closure was approved by Assistant Bishop Rob Nolan. It was at 2385 Kooroongarra Road; it has been sold and converted into a house.

The town name changed from South Koorongara to Koorongara in 1977 and then the spelling was altered to Kooroongarra in 2000. The name is derived from Aboriginal words, kooroon meaning resting place for birds and garra meaning water.

Education 
There are no schools in Kooroongarra. The nearest government primary schools are Leyburn State School in Leyburn to the north-east and Millmerran State School in Millmerran to the north. The nearest government secondary school is Millmerran State School which offers secondary schooling to Year 10. There are no nearby schools offering secondary education to Year 12; distance education and boarding schools are options.

See also 

 List of schools in Darling Downs

References 

Towns in Queensland
Toowoomba Region
Localities in Queensland